Martín Zepeda Hernández (born 12 January 1967) is a Mexican politician affiliated with the Party of the Democratic Revolution. As of 2014 he served as Deputy of the LX Legislature of the Mexican Congress representing the State of Mexico.

References

1967 births
Living people
Politicians from the State of Mexico
Party of the Democratic Revolution politicians
21st-century Mexican politicians
Deputies of the LX Legislature of Mexico
Members of the Chamber of Deputies (Mexico) for the State of Mexico